Hulda Marilyne Nfono Ondo represented Woleu-Ntem in the 2014 Miss Gabon pageant. She was crowned the 2nd Runner-up at Miss Gabon, and automatically awarded Miss Earth Gabon 2014.

Category
Miss Earth 2014
Miss Gabon

References

External links
 Miss Earth Official Website

Miss Earth 2014 contestants
Gabonese beauty pageant winners
Living people
Year of birth missing (living people)